Javier Rubén Velázquez (born 3 February 1984) is an Argentine professional footballer who plays a forward for Almirante Brown.

Honours
Talleres
 Torneo Federal A: 2015

References
 
 

1984 births
Living people
Argentine footballers
Association football forwards
Independiente Rivadavia footballers
Racing Club de Avellaneda footballers
Club Deportivo Palestino footballers
Talleres de Córdoba footballers
Chilean Primera División players
Argentine Primera División players
Argentine expatriate footballers
Argentine expatriate sportspeople in Chile
Expatriate footballers in Chile
People from Zárate, Buenos Aires
Sportspeople from Buenos Aires Province